The Tilton River is a tributary of the Cowlitz River, in the U.S. state of Washington.

Course
The Tilton River originates in the Cascade Range just north of Mount St. Helens and southwest of Mount Rainier. It flows south and west, joining the Cowlitz River in Lake Mayfield, near Mossyrock.

See also
List of rivers of Washington
Tributaries of the Columbia River

References

Rivers of Lewis County, Washington
Rivers of Washington (state)